The 1985 Nabisco Grand Prix de Verano, also known as the Buenos Aires Grand Prix, was a men's Nabisco Grand Prix tennis tournament held in Buenos Aires, Argentina and played on outdoor clay courts. It was the 17th edition of the tournament and was held from 25 February to 3 March 1985. Third-seeded Martín Jaite won the singles title.

Finals

Singles

 Martín Jaite defeated  Diego Pérez 6–4, 6–2
 It was Jaite's first singles title of his career.

Doubles
 Martín Jaite /  Christian Miniussi defeated  Eduardo Bengoechea /  Diego Pérez 6–4, 6–3
 It was Jaite's 1st title of the year and the 1st of his career. It was Miniussi's only title of the year and the 1st of his career.

Prize money

*per team

References

External links 
 ITF tournament edition details

 
Nabisco Grand Prix de Verano
South American Championships
February 1985 sports events in South America
March 1985 sports events in South America